Munir Sadiq (born 23 February 1955) is a Pakistani former sailor, a three-time Asian Games gold medalist, winning his first at the 1978 Games in Bangkok. With a silver medal in the open enterprise class at the 1998 Asian Games, Sadiq became the first sailor to win five medals at the Asian Games. He also competed in the 470 event at the 1984 Summer Olympics.

Early life and education
Mr Sadiq completed his early education from Cadet College, Petaro in 1973.

Career
After graduating from Cadet College Petaro, he joined Pakistan Navy as an officer. After an illustrious career he retired as a Captain from the Pakistan Navy, he moved to the UAE to join the UAE's Rashid bin Saeed Al Al Maktoum Naval College where he coached the cadets and helped them with winning the world championship.

Sailing career
Munir started sailing during his time in the Navy. In 1978, he partnered with Byram Avari to win Pakistan's first sailing gold in the Enterprise class at the Asian Games. He went on to win two more golds with a new partner, Muhammad Zakaullah, winning at the 1986 Asian Games at Seoul, South Korea, and the 1990 Asian Games in Beijing, China. Pakistan's dominance at these Games was ended when at the 1994 Hiroshima Games, he was relegated to the silver with a new partner, Mamoon Sadiq.

Family
Sadiq is married with two children.
Son is Arsalan Sadiq and daughter Nowayrah Sadiq.

Award
 President's Pride of Performance (1987) by the president of Pakistan  and Tamgha - e - Imtiaz (Military) from Pakistan Navy.

References

1955 births
Living people
Pakistan Navy officers
Pakistani sailors
Pakistani male sailors (sport)
Olympic sailors of Pakistan
Sailors at the 1984 Summer Olympics – 470
Asian Games gold medalists for Pakistan
Asian Games silver medalists for Pakistan
Asian Games medalists in sailing
Sailors at the 1978 Asian Games
Sailors at the 1986 Asian Games
Sailors at the 1990 Asian Games
Sailors at the 1994 Asian Games
Sailors at the 1998 Asian Games
Medalists at the 1978 Asian Games
Medalists at the 1986 Asian Games
Medalists at the 1990 Asian Games
Medalists at the 1994 Asian Games
Medalists at the 1998 Asian Games
Cadet College Petaro alumni
Recipients of the Pride of Performance